Bhanoth (Sindhi :ڀاڻوٺ) is a town of Hala Taluka, Matiari District of Sindh, Pakistan. It has status of Union Council of Hala Tehsil. The education for boys and girls is available at high school level in the town. Bhanoth was a big sea port in times of Shah Latif and even before it, Bhanoth is under the political and leadership control of Syed Family from 200 to 300 years, migrated to Bhanoth from Sann, Sindh.  

Political and local personalities of Bhanoth are Syed Shah Muhammad Shah, Syed Rasool Bux Shah, Syed Haji Ghulam Shah, Syed Shah Zaman shah, Syed Sher Muhammad Shah.

All the government buildings such as primary girls school, hospital, govt girls high school, govt boys high school, water supply building, sanitation building are built on the plots given free of cost by Syed Family of Bhanoth mostly by Syed Rasool Bux Shah.

Bhanoth also has a registered non-governmental organization, GSTT Bhanoth.

References 

Matiari District